The 1978–79 Cincinnati Stingers season was the Stingers' last season of operation in the World Hockey Association.

Offseason

Regular season

Final standings

Game log

Playoffs

Player stats

Awards and records

Transactions

Farm teams

See also
1978–79 WHA season

References

External links

Cincinnati Stingers seasons
Cinc
Cinc